Raymondiceras is genus of ammonoid cephalopod belonging to the Cheiloceratidae family. Species belonging to this genus lived in late Devonian (Famennian).

Species and distribution

 Raymondiceras inceptum Petersen, 1975: ca 367.6 - 366.9 mya of Western Australia
 Raymondiceras simplex Raymond, 1909: ca 370.0 - 366.8 mya of Montana (USA). This species has been originally assigned to genus Prolobites. This is type species for genus Raymondiceras.

References

Goniatitida genera
Cheiloceratidae
Late Devonian ammonites
Ammonites of Australia
Ammonites of North America
Famennian life
Famennian genus first appearances
Famennian genus extinctions